Blessed is a 2004 British-Romanian horror film directed by Simon Fellows and starring Heather Graham and James Purefoy. It marks the final film appearance of David Hemmings, and the film is dedicated to him.

Plot
The Howards are a young married couple living in New York. Craig, an unpublished writer, and Samantha, a school teacher, are desperate to have a baby. Their hopes are dashed when Samantha is diagnosed as infertile and the couple can't afford the medical treatments that might allow her to conceive. Just when it seems their dreams are impossible, the couple are given the opportunity to receive free treatments from a new, and relatively unheard of, fertility clinic. The Spiritus Research Clinic is in Lakeview, a small town two hours away, and they move to the clinic.

It soon becomes clear something is amiss. In the laboratory where the couple's eggs and sperm samples are being mixed, the scientist takes a large, engraved metal needle and injects a red substance into Craig's sperm without the couple's knowledge. After the treatments, they are overjoyed when it is discovered Samantha is pregnant with twins.

Earlier in the film, Craig was introduced at a party to book publisher Earl Sidney. Suddenly the publisher wants to publish Craig's book and offers Craig $100,000 as an advance.

The pregnant Samantha begins feeling unusually painful scratching from the unborn twins. She is also suspicious of her husband's new business associate and friend. She feels ignored and distanced from Craig.

Meanwhile, a hooded stranger begins stalking Samantha. Samantha becomes friends with a priest, Father Carlo. It is he who tells Samantha she is the unknowing victim of a pact with evil. The book publisher and the scientists at the clinic are connected to "The New Light of Dawn" church, a secret devil-worshiping cult. The red liquid injected into the Howards' test-tube pregnancy was the Devil's DNA. The cult plans to kidnap the babies shortly after birth and raise them to eventually destroy mankind. Father Carlo tells Samantha to drink a poison that will kill the babies, but she smashes the glass against his face. The crazed priest is also the hooded figure that has been following Samantha and sets the motel room he had taken her to on fire. He then gets in a car and drives away towards the clinic, with the intention to destroy it. He crashes through one operating room to another until crashing into Dr. Leeds' office. Gasoline spills on the priest as he tells the doctor "He who walks with Satan shall burn in Hell" and then sets himself on fire with a lighter. Prior to destroying the clinic, however, we see that Earl Sidney has already left the clinic with the metal container containing the blood of Lucifer.

Samantha and Craig manage to escape. Four years later, they celebrate the birthday of their twin daughters with a costume party. One of the guest children (who has disguised himself as the Devil) teases one of the girls and soon, he chokes on a grape and dies, his skin rotting and hardening. Samantha stares at her twins in horror, wondering.

Cast
 Heather Graham -  Samantha Howard
 James Purefoy - Craig Howard
 Fionnula Flanagan - J. Lloyd Samuel
 Alan McKenna -  Detective Connors
 Michael J. Reynolds - Dr. Lohman
 Debora Weston - Dr. Leeds
 Stella Stevens - Betty
 William Hootkins - Detective Lauderdale
 Andy Serkis - Father Carlo
 David Hemmings -  Earl Sidney
 Michele Gentille - Mrs. Guber
 Tess Lynden-Bell - Samantha and Craig's baby
 Star Lynden-Bell - Samantha and Craigs second baby

Production
The working title of the film was "Samantha's Child", the title under which it was released in the United States.  During filming, David Hemmings suffered a heart attack and was pronounced dead on the scene, according to his agent Liz Nelson: "he had just finished his final shots of the day and was going back to his dressing room". The production was filmed on locations in New York City and Romania, including Bucharest.

Reception
Critical reception for Blessed has been negative, with Bloody Disgusting saying "Consider yourself Blessed that you've never had to sit through DEJ and Warner Home Video's lackluster drama/thriller starring Heather Graham." Cinema Crazed described Blessed as "a horribly written, terribly directed, muddled piece of tripe that takes every advantage to mimic "Rosemary's Baby" and fails big time". EfilmCritic.com wrote that "horror hounds will undoubtedly walk away disappointed...if they're not fast asleep."

References

External links
 
 
 
 Blessed at Filmaffinity

2004 films
2000s supernatural horror films
British horror films
Romanian horror films
English-language Romanian films
2004 horror films
British pregnancy films
The Devil in film
Films about cults
Films about educators
Films about Satanism
Films about twin sisters
Films about writers
Films set in New York (state)
Films shot in New York City
Films shot in Romania
Films shot in Bucharest
British supernatural horror films
Films produced by Donald Kushner
2004 directorial debut films
2000s English-language films
Films directed by Simon Fellows
2000s British films